Martin Charles Rowlands (born 8 February 1979) is an English-born Irish former professional footballer who played as a midfielder.

Club career
After starring for Heston Gaels GAA club at underage level, Rowlands started his football career at Wycombe Wanderers, but did not earn a professional contract and joined Farnborough Town in 1997 before moving to Brentford in August 1998 for a transfer fee of £45,000. In five seasons with Brentford, he made 186 appearances in all competitions, scoring 23 goals.

After suffering a broken leg, Queens Park Rangers manager Ian Holloway took a gamble on Rowlands and signed him on a free transfer from local rivals Brentford in the summer of 2003. This gamble paid off, as Rowlands scored 12 goals from midfield, helping his new side to promotion from the Second Division. That season, Rowlands also showed versatility, playing right back, right midfield, left midfield and centre midfield; excelling in all positions. He won both the supporters and players' player of the year competitions.

Since then, Rowlands has suffered many injuries and has never truly recaptured his outstanding form of 2003–04. However, in 2006–07 he managed to score 10 goals from midfield.

In 2007–08 he was selected captain, and was regularly among Rangers` best performers. He played 43 league games, scoring 6 goals, including a memorable brace in Rangers' 4–2 victory at Watford. He won both the Supporters' Player of the Year and the Ray Jones Players' Player of the Year award. As of January 2012 Rowlands was the longest-serving member of the Queens Park Rangers squad having spent nine years at the club.

On 25 February 2011 Rowlands signed for Millwall, on an emergency one-month loan, after only playing 23 minutes of competitive football for QPR in the 2010–11 season. On 31 January 2012, Rowlands' contract with Queens Park Rangers was terminated by mutual consent. On 2 February 2012, Rowlands signed a contract with Colchester United. After a solid three months with the U's, he was released from his contract after suffering with injuries. He made nine appearances and scored two goals during his time in Essex.

Rowlands signed on a month-long contract with Leyton Orient on 28 August 2012, after spending several weeks training with the London club, and featuring in two pre-season friendly matches.

On 22 September 2012, Rowlands scored his first Orient goal, a 20-yard volley against Crewe Alexandra at Gresty Road. The game ended 1–1. After 40 appearances and four goals in all competitions, he rejected a contract extension at the end of the 2012–13 season, and became a free agent.

Rowlands signed for Conference Premier side Aldershot Town for the 2013–14 season.

International career
Following good displays with Queens Park Rangers, Rowlands was called up to the Republic of Ireland squad in the summer of 2004, playing two games. His good club form in season 2007/2008 and his subsequent player of the year awards with Queens Park Rangers led to Rowlands being included in Giovanni Trappatoni's first Republic of Ireland squad.

After a substitute appearance against Italy in Ireland's penultimate qualifying game for the 2010 World Cup, Rowlands was chosen to start for Ireland against Montenegro in their final group game.

On 14 October 2009, he injured his anterior cruciate ligament while playing for the Republic of Ireland against Montenegro, resulting in him being ruled out of the rest of the 2009–10 season for QPR.

Personal life
Rowlands attended Fielding Primary School in Northfields and Drayton Manor High School. He has four brothers. Rowlands is now a football agent for the Stellar group

Career statistics

Club

International

Honours

Club
Brentford
Football League Third Division winner: 1998–99
Football League Trophy runner-up: 2001Queens Park Rangers'''
Football League Second Division runner up: 2003–04

Individual
 Brentford Supporters' Player of the Year: 1999–00

See also
 List of Republic of Ireland international footballers born outside the Republic of Ireland

References

External links

1979 births
Living people
Footballers from Hammersmith
English footballers
Republic of Ireland association footballers
Republic of Ireland under-21 international footballers
Republic of Ireland international footballers
Association football midfielders
Farnborough F.C. players
Brentford F.C. players
Queens Park Rangers F.C. players
Millwall F.C. players
Wycombe Wanderers F.C. players
English Football League players
Colchester United F.C. players
Leyton Orient F.C. players
Aldershot Town F.C. players
National League (English football) players